Gaffney is a surname common to the region of Cavan in Ireland, and now spread across other English-speaking nations. Gaffney comes from the Gaelic septs of Ó Gamhna, Mac Conghamhna and Ó Caibheanaigh. Gaffney more commonly does not appear with the Gaelic prefixes of O' or Mc but there have been Gaffneys recorded with either of the Gaelic prefixes.

In Hebrew context the surname Gaffney (Hebrew: גפני, alternative English spellings: Gafni/Gafny) is used for Jewish people whose ancestors were wine makers as "Geffen" (גפן) is the Hebrew word for vitis.

Notable people with the surname include:
 Beryl Gaffney (born 1930), Canadian politician
 Christopher Gaffney (bishop) (died 1576), Irish bishop
 Chris Gaffney (musician) (1950–2008), American singer–songwriter
 Christopher Gaffney (archaeologist) (born 1962), British archaeologist
 Chris Gaffaney (born 1975), New Zealand cricketer
 David Gaffney (born 1961), British writer
 Dean Gaffney (born 1978), British actor
 Derrick Gaffney (born 1955), American football player
 Edward Gaffney (born 1943), American politician
 Elizabeth Gaffney (born 1966), American novelist
 Eric Gaffney, American songwriter
 Eugene S. Gaffney, American paleontologist
 F. Drew Gaffney, American doctor
 Frank Gaffney (born 1953), American lobbyist
 Frank Gaffney (Medal of Honor) (1883–1948), American soldier
 Jabar Gaffney (born 1980), American football player
 James Anthony Gaffney, British civil engineer
 James E. Gaffney (1868–1932), American baseball executive
 Jim Gaffney (born 1921), American football player
 John Gaffney (1855–1913), American baseball umpire and manager
 Kiley Gaffney, Australian musician
 Mason Gaffney, (1923–2020), American economist
 Matt Gaffney, (born 1972), American crossword puzzle constructor
 Mo Gaffney (born 1958), American actress
 Patricia Gaffney, American writer
 Robert J. Gaffney, American politician
 Robbie Gaffney (born 1957), Irish football player
 Rose Gaffney (1895–1979), American environmental activist
 Tony Gaffney (born 1984), American basketball player

See also 
 Gaffney, South Carolina, a city in the United States
 Kelly Gaffney, fictional character in Law & Order: Trial by Jury
 Roger Gaffney, fictional character in Homicide: Life on the Street
 Tom Gaffney, fictional character in Scarface (1932)

Anglicised Irish-language surnames
Jewish surnames
Surnames of Irish origin